There is at present no military conscription in Canada. Conscription was implemented in Canada during the First and Second World Wars, for men of military age and fitness.

Conscription crises
Conscription Crisis of 1917
Conscription Crisis of 1944

See also
Military Service Act (Canada)

 
Canada